Mahesh Bhupathi and Mike Bryan were the defending champions but did not compete that year.

Robbie Koenig and Martín Rodríguez won in the final 6–3, 7–6 (7–4) against Martin Damm and Cyril Suk.

Seeds
Champion seeds are indicated in bold text while text in italics indicates the round in which those seeds were eliminated.

n/a
 Yevgeny Kafelnikov /  Fabrice Santoro (semifinals)
 Martin Damm /  Cyril Suk (final)
 Wayne Black /  Kevin Ullyett (quarterfinals)

Draw

External links
 2003 TD Waterhouse Cup Doubles Draw

Connecticut Open (tennis)
2003 ATP Tour